The Samsung NX500 is a mirrorless interchangeable lens camera announced by Samsung in February 2015. Like the flagship Samsung NX1, it has a 28-megapixel back-illuminated sensor, but lacks the electronic viewfinder of the top model. It succeeds the Samsung NX300.

References
 Samsung: NX500 with 16-50mm Power Zoom lens 
 Samsung: NX500 Press Release
 Imaging Resource: Samsung NX500 Specifications
 Geeky Splash: Samsung NX500 – Specifations and Features

External links
Official product page

Live-preview digital cameras
NX 500
Cameras introduced in 2015